Euscelis incisa is a leafhopper species in the family Cicadellidae. It is found in Europe, North Africa, and Asia. It is formerly known as Euscelis plebejus, among other names.

Biology
Euscelis incisa can be used as a vector of the bacterium Spiroplasma citri, a mollicute bacterium that is the causative agent of the Citrus stubborn disease, to experimentally infect white clover (Trifolium repens).

References

Athysanini
Hemiptera of Africa
Hemiptera of Asia
Hemiptera of Europe
Insect vectors of plant pathogens
Insects described in 1858